4×4=12 (pronounced "four times four equals twelve") is the fifth studio album by Canadian electronic music producer Deadmau5, released on December 6, 2010 by Virgin Records, Ultra Records and Mau5trap. The album's title refers to a miscalculation made by Deadmau5 on his Ustream channel, where he mistakenly said that his live setup of four banks of four "equals 12" instead of 16. The album received a nomination at the 54th Grammy Awards for Best Dance/Electronica Album.

Promotion 
Deadmau5 was the house DJ at the 2010 MTV Video Music Awards show hosted by Chelsea Handler in Los Angeles, California on September 12. He opened the event with "Some Chords", then as the night progressed, he played "Sofi Needs a Ladder", "Cthulhu Sleeps", and "Animal Rights". Deadmau5 also performed at the 54th Grammy Awards in 2012. First, he performed with Foo Fighters ("Rope" Deadmau5 Remix), and then played "Raise Your Weapon". On the same day, after the show, he revealed two new mau5heads.

Release 
4×4=12 was released internationally on December 6, 2010 by Virgin Records, and released in the United States through Ultra Records and Deadmau5's record label Mau5trap; on December 7, 2010. On 23 February 2011, Ultra Records released the Japanese version of the album, which was renamed simply to Deadmau5. The self-titled release was bundled with his earlier singles "Ghosts 'n' Stuff" and "I Remember".

On iTunes, the international mixed CD version of the album has the track names "A City In Florida" as "City In Florida", "Cthulhu Sleeps" as "Cthulhu Steps" and "Raise Your Weapon" as "Raise Your Weapons". This has not been confirmed as intentional or unintentional.

Singles 
"Some Chords" was released as the first official single from the album on May 3, 2010 exclusively on Beatport, later released on iTunes, on November 7, 2010. "Animal Rights", a collaboration with American DJ Wolfgang Gartner, was the second single from the album, released exclusively on Beatport on September 6, 2010 and followed by release on other digital download stores on September 17, 2010. The third single was "Sofi Needs a Ladder", released on October 31, 2010. It features vocals from Sofi and is the highest-charting single in the UK, reaching number 68. On November 14, the fourth single "Right This Second" was released peaking at number 79 on US charts and 100 on UK charts. Later the same month, the fifth single "Bad Selection" was released charting at 137 on the UK charts. The sixth and final single was "Raise Your Weapon", a song featuring vocals from  Greta Svabo Bech and was co-produced by Cydney Sheffield & Skrillex, released on May 23, 201, became a hit on the charts, It became his first song to chart on the US Billboard Hot 100 as well as reaching 117 on the UK charts.

Critical reception 

The album was generally well received among music critics. Metacritic assigned it an average score of 66 out of 100, based on 13 reviews. Will Hermes of Rolling Stone touted the album writing, "4×4=12 is audacious, mixing generic house grooves with electric fare." Many reviewers praised the album for its universal appeal to a diverse audience. Annie Zaleski of Alternative Press wrote, "The collection is mostly instrumental tracks, ranging in style from insistent progressive house to watery techno...Without vocals to provide structure, 4×4=12s variety stems from Deadmau5's sense of dynamics and pacing, as well as his diverse sonic influences". However, some critics were less enthusiastic. Allison Stewart of The Washington Post stated, "4×4 is a breakthrough album that doesn't feel like a breakthrough album. Not accessible or crowd-pleasing enough to court non-electronic music fans, not adventurous enough to satisfy die-hards, it pleases, but it rarely dazzles." Dave Simpson of The Guardian shared in Ms. Stewart's sentiments by noting, "Undoubtedly, the Deadmau5 appeal hinges on the astonishing live show in which Zimmerman performs in a giant, illuminated mouse's head, but it wouldn't work without his tracks. His third production compilation again shows that he is a master at doing simple electro house music very well: humongous beats and basslines blend with straightforward chord progressions and, when interest may start to lag, sonic diversions."

Commercial performance 
4×4=12 proved to become a breakthrough commercial success for Deadmau5 when it became his first studio album to chart on the Billboard Top 200. It eventually peaked within the top fifty of the Billboard Top 200 and has spent over 100 weeks on the chart. It also narrowly missed the top spot of the Billboard Electronic albums, reaching number two. Internationally, the album was received warmly as well. It managed to chart within the top forty of various European nations, replicating and in many cases eclipsing the chart success of his previous efforts. In the United Kingdom, however, the album achieved a lower peak compared to his previous albums which all entered the top twenty, missing the top forty altogether.

Track listing

Double LP version

Charts

Weekly charts

Year-end charts

Certifications

Release history

References

External links 
 4×4=12 at Discogs
 Deadmau5 – 4×4=12  at Australian-Charts
 Deadmau5 – 4x4=12  at iTunes
 Deadmau5 – 4x4=12  at Spotify

2010 albums
Deadmau5 albums
Ultra Records albums
Virgin Records albums
Mau5trap albums